Katherine  Ann Bald (born December 19, 1963) is a former competitive freestyle swimmer from Canada.  She was affiliated with the University of Toronto.

Bald competed for her native country at the 1988 Summer Olympics in Seoul, South Korea.  There she finished in sixth position in the women's 4x100-metre freestyle relay, with her teammates Patricia Noall, Andrea Nugent and Jane Kerr.

Bald won a gold medal in the 100-metre breaststroke and a silver in the 200-metre breaststroke at the 1982 Commonwealth Games in Brisbane, Australia.  At the 1983 Pan American Games in Caracas, Venezuela, she won a gold medal in the 200-metre breaststroke, silver medals in the 100-metre breaststroke and 4x100-metre freestyle relay, and a bronze in the 100-metre freestyle.

References
 Canadian Olympic Committee
 

1963 births
Living people
Canadian female breaststroke swimmers
Canadian female freestyle swimmers
Commonwealth Games gold medallists for Canada
Olympic swimmers of Canada
Sportspeople from Etobicoke
Swimmers at the 1983 Pan American Games
Swimmers at the 1988 Summer Olympics
Swimmers from Toronto
University of Toronto alumni
Commonwealth Games medallists in swimming
Commonwealth Games silver medallists for Canada
Pan American Games gold medalists for Canada
Pan American Games silver medalists for Canada
Pan American Games bronze medalists for Canada
Pan American Games medalists in swimming
Swimmers at the 1982 Commonwealth Games
Medalists at the 1983 Pan American Games
20th-century Canadian women
21st-century Canadian women
Medallists at the 1982 Commonwealth Games